Morphia, also called morphine, is a highly potent opiate analgesic drug.

Morphia may also refer to:

 Morphia (Dutch band), a doom metal music group
 Morphia of Melitene (died c. 1126), queen consort of Jerusalem
 Morphine (film) or Morfiy, a 2008 Russian film by Aleksei Balabanov, based on a 1926 short story by Mikhail Bulgakov

Distinguish from
Morphea, a skin condition with white patches